Morris dancing is a form of English folk dance. It is based on rhythmic stepping and the execution of choreographed figures by a group of dancers, usually wearing bell pads on their shins. Implements such as sticks, swords and handkerchiefs may also be wielded by the dancers. In a small number of dances for one or two people, steps are near and across a pair of clay tobacco pipes laid one across the other on the floor. They clap their sticks, swords, or handkerchiefs together to match with the dance.

The earliest known and surviving English written mention of Morris dance is dated to 1448 and records the payment of seven shillings to Morris dancers by the Goldsmiths' Company in London. Further mentions of Morris dancing occur in the late 16th century, and there are also early records such as bishops' "Visitation Articles" mentioning sword dancing, guising and other dancing activities, as well as mumming plays.

While the earliest records invariably mention "Morys" in a court setting, and a little later in the Lord Mayors' Processions in London, it had assumed the nature of a folk dance performed in the parishes by the mid 17th century.

The world of Morris in England is organised and supported by three organisations: Morris Ring, Morris Federation and Open Morris, although all three organisations have members from other countries. 

There are around 150 Morris sides (or teams) in the United States. English expatriates form a larger part of the Morris tradition in Australia, Canada, New Zealand and Hong Kong. There are isolated groups in other countries, for example those in Utrecht and Helmond, Netherlands; the Arctic Morris Group of Helsinki, Finland and Stockholm, Sweden; as well as in Cyprus and St Petersburg, Russia.

Name and origins

Throughout history, the Morris seems to have been common. It was imported from village festivities into popular entertainment after the invention of the court masque by Henry VIII. The word Morris apparently derived from "morisco", meaning "Moorish". Cecil Sharp, whose collecting of Morris dances preserved many from extinction, suggested that it might have arisen from the dancers' blacking their faces as part of the necessary ritual disguise.

"Moorish dance". The term entered English via Flemish mooriske danse. Comparable terms in other languages include German Moriskentanz (also from the 15th century), French morisques, Croatian moreška, and moresco, moresca or morisca in Italy and Spain. The modern spelling Morris-dance first appears in the 17th century. In Edward Phillips's The New World of English Words, first published in 1658, the term morisco was referenced as both "a Moor" and "the Morris dance, as it were the Moorish dance", while John Bullokar defined it in 1695 as "a certain dance used among the Moors; whence our Morris dance".

It is unclear how the dance came by this name, "unless in reference to fantastic dancing or costumes", i.e. the deliberately "exotic" flavour of the performance. The English dance thus apparently arose as part of a wider 15th-century European fashion for supposedly "Moorish" spectacle, which also left traces in Spanish and Italian folk dance. The means and chronology of the transmission of this fashion is now difficult to trace; the London Chronicle recorded "spangled Spanish dancers" performed an energetic dance before King Henry VII at Christmas in 1494, but Heron's accounts also mention "pleying of the mourice dance" four days earlier, and the attestation of the English term from the mid-15th century establishes that there was a "Moorish dance" performed in England decades prior to 1494.

An alternative derivation from the Latin 'mos, moris' (custom and usage) has also been suggested.

It has been suggested that the tradition of rural English dancers blackening their faces may be a form of disguise, or a reference either to the Moors or to miners; the origins of the practice remain unclear and are the subject of ongoing debate. In June 2020 the Joint Morris Organisation called for the use of black makeup to be discontinued in response to the Black Lives Matter movement. Groups that used face paint changed to blue, green, or yellow and black stripes.

History in England

The earliest (15th-century) references place the Morris dance in a courtly setting. The dance became part of performances for the lower classes by the later 16th century. Henry VIII owned a gold salt cellar which depicted a Morris Dance with five dancers and a "tabrett". A "tabret" is a small tabor drum. On 4 January 1552, George Ferrers, the Lord of Misrule of Edward VI, put on a show in London which included "mores danse, dansyng with a tabret". In 1600, the Shakespearean actor William Kempe Morris danced from London to Norwich, an event chronicled in his Nine Daies Wonder (1600).

Almost nothing is known about the folk dances of England prior to the mid-17th century. While it is possible to speculate on the transition of "Morris dancing" from the courtly to a rural setting, it may have acquired elements of pre-Elizabethan (medieval) folk dance, such proposals will always be based on an argument from silence as there is no direct record of what such elements would have looked like. In the Elizabethan period, there was significant cultural contact between Italy and England, and it has been suggested that much of what is now considered traditional English folk dance, and especially English country dance, is descended from Italian dances imported in the 16th century.

By the mid 17th century, the working peasantry took part in Morris dances, especially at Whitsun. The Puritan government of Oliver Cromwell, however, suppressed Whitsun ales and other such festivities. When the crown was restored by Charles II, the springtime festivals were restored. In particular, Whitsun Ales came to be celebrated on Whitsunday (Pentecost), as the date was close to the birthday of Charles II.

A regional reference occurs in Horsham, Sussex in 1750.

Morris dancing continued in popularity until the industrial revolution and its accompanying social changes. Four teams claim a continuous lineage of tradition within their village or town: Abingdon (their Morris team was kept going by the Hemmings family), Bampton, Headington Quarry, and Chipping Campden. Other villages have revived their own traditions, and hundreds of other teams across the globe have adopted (and adapted) these traditions, or have created their own styles from the basic building blocks of Morris stepping and figures.

By the late 19th century, and in the West Country at least, Morris dancing was fast becoming more a local memory than an activity. D'Arcy Ferris (or de Ferrars), a Cheltenham-based singer, music teacher and organiser of pageants, became intrigued by the tradition and sought to revive it. He first encountered Morris in Bidford and organised its revival. Over the following years he took the side to several places in the West Country, from Malvern to Bicester and from Redditch to Moreton in Marsh. By 1910, he and Cecil Sharp were in correspondence on the subject.

Several English folklorists were responsible for recording and reviving the tradition in the early 20th century, often from a bare handful of surviving members of mid-19th-century village sides. Among these, the most notable are Cecil Sharp and Mary Neal.

Revival
Boxing Day 1899 is widely regarded as the starting point for the Morris revival. Cecil Sharp was visiting at a friend's house in Headington, near Oxford, when the Headington Quarry Morris side arrived to perform. Sharp was intrigued by the music and collected several tunes from the side's musician, William Kimber, including Country Gardens. A decade later he begin collecting the dances, spurred and at first assisted by Mary Neal, a founder of the Espérance Club (a dressmaking co-operative and club for young working women in London), and Herbert MacIlwaine, musical director of the Espérance Club. Neal was looking for dances for her girls to perform, and so the first revival performance was by young women in London.

Organisations

In the first few decades of the 20th century, several men's sides were formed, and in 1934 the Morris Ring was founded by six revival sides:

Cambridge Morris Men
Letchworth Morris
Thaxted Morris Men
East Surrey Morris Men
Greensleeves Morris Men (based in Wimbledon)
Oxford Morris (which was not at the initial ring meeting at Thaxted but was influential in the creation of the Ring's constitution).

In the 1950s and especially the 1960s, there was an explosion of new dance teams, some of them women's or mixed sides. At the time, there was often heated debate over the propriety and even legitimacy of women dancing the Morris, even though there is evidence as far back as the 16th century that there were female Morris dancers. There are now male, female and mixed sides to be found.

Partly because women's and mixed sides were not eligible for full membership of the Morris Ring (this has now changed), two other national (and international) bodies were formed, the Morris Federation and Open Morris. All three bodies provide communication, advice, insurance, instructionals (teaching sessions) and social and dancing opportunities to their members. The three bodies co-operate on some issues, while maintaining their distinct identities. An umbrella body that includes all three, the Joint Morris Organisation, organises joint events and discusses issues that affect all members, such as access to both public liability and personal insurance cover.

Morris dancing in Wales 
The United Kingdom experienced a revival in folk dancing and Morris dancing in the 1960s. In Wales this meant, in part, a resurgence in interest in the Nantgarw tradition from sides who were looking for Welsh dances to add to their English ones. Cardiff Morris Men began piecing together a Morris dance from the notes that had been written down by Ceinwen Thomas on one particular dance that she called Y Gaseg Eira . After this 'original' dance had been pieced back together sides began to create more dances that were 'in the style of' this traditional Nantgarw Morris dance. Many of these new creations, such as Y Derwydd, are now held to be just as much a part of the Nantgarw tradition as the original dance. Today there are five Morris dances that are commonly recognised as being a part of the Nantgarw tradition. The five dances in the Nantgarw tradition include: Y Gaseg Eira (The Snow Mare), Hela'r Sgwarnog (Hunting the Hare), Ty Coch Caerdydd (Red House of Cardiff), Y Derwydd (The Druid) and Y Goron (The Crown).

There are no hard and fast rules as to which Morris sides can perform dances from a tradition, but the original Nantgarw dance, Y Gaseg Eira, is considered to be a dance for the Welsh sides. Consequently, it is often performed by the sides Isca Morris and Cardiff Morris. It was members of Cardiff Morris who developed the modern Nantgarw dances and so they are the most common performers of these dances.

It has been pointed out that there are "obvious" similarities between the Welsh Nantgarw style of Morris dance and the English Lichfield style of Morris dance. It is known that there were potteries in Nantgarw and these were largely staffed by workers from Staffordshire where Lichfield Morris was danced.

Dances

Y Gaseg Eira (The Snow Mare) 

This handkerchief dance has a pattern entirely peculiar to itself and was the first Nantgarw dance to see the light of day with the Cardiff Morris. The name of the dance is a Welsh idiom for a very large snowball, and it is so named because at one point in the dance the hand waving movements resemble the movements of somebody rolling a large snowball.This is the original Nantgarw dance and was being danced by Cardiff Morris by 1974. An article in the Welsh Folk Dance Magazine published in 1959 featured an article on this dance along with a photograph of a side performing it.

Hela'r Sgwarnog (Hunting the Hare) 
This is the first of three dances which conform to a standard pattern; which can, with a little care, be memorised and need, therefore, no calling. Like Y Gaseg Eira it is a handkerchief dance. The current practise with the music is to use hornpipe time, which lends a lilt to the dance that some people find attractive. It had been added to the Nantgarw repertoire by 1984.

Ty Coch Caerdydd (The Red House of Cardiff) 
Sixteen sticks lend a certain weight to the stick bag, if not the proceedings. The sticks are held skiing-fashion (as in downhill, not slalom or cross-country) and are brought up in front of the face to clash. It was being danced by 1984.

Y Derwydd (The Druid) 
Previously known as Y Gamel (The Camel) until it was renamed after the tune it is danced to. There are only eight sticks in this dance and no clashing except in the chorus. The dance pattern is identical to that of Hunting the Hare, even down to the half-heys in the chorus, except that the corner figures are completely replaced with Stars. It was put together in 1991.

Y Goron (The Crown) 
This is a stick dance based around circular hays.

Nos Galan (New Year's Eve) 
This is a processional dance. Unlike the other dances which take place in one location this dance takes the dancers from one place to another. It takes its name from an old Welsh carol, the tune for which was used for the melody of "Deck the Halls".

The Moves

Figures 
The figures can be summarised as Foot Up, Corners Change, Top Hey, Bottom Hey and Circular Hey, with usually a distinctive verse figure unique to each dance.

Steps 

There is double step throughout, except when 'chipping' (hopping in one spot whilst simultaneously rotating). The basic pattern is two double steps followed by four capers. There had been a tendency to truncate the second double step and leap straight into the capers, leading to a loss of balance and poise. The hand movements are straight up-and-down, with Adderbury-style circular movements at waist level for the capers. In the 'chipping' sequences in Y Gaseg Eira and Hunting the Hare the arms are raised in turn and in time with the single stepping which accompanies it.

Styles 
Today, there are six predominant styles of Morris dancing, and different dances or traditions within each style named after their region of origin.
 Cotswold Morris: dances from an area mostly in Gloucestershire and Oxfordshire; an established misnomer, since the Cotswolds overlap this region only partially. Normally danced with handkerchiefs or sticks to accompany the hand movements. Dances are usually for 6 or 8 dancers, but solo and duo dances (known as single or double jigs) also occur.
 North West Morris: more military in style and often processional, that developed out of the mills in the North-West of England in the 19th and early 20th centuries.
 Border Morris from the English-Welsh border: a simpler, looser, more vigorous style, occasionally danced with blackened or coloured faces.
 Long Sword dance from Yorkshire and Teesdale, danced with long, rigid metal or wooden swords for, usually, six or eight dancers.
 Rapper sword from Northumberland and County Durham, danced with short flexible sprung steel swords, usually for five dancers.
 Molly dance from Cambridgeshire. Traditionally danced on Plough Monday, they were Feast dances that were danced to collect money during harsh winters. One of the dancers would be dressed as a woman, hence the name. Joseph Needham identified two separate families of Molly dances, one from three villages in the Cambridge area and one from two in the Ely area.
 Ploughstots (alternatively Vessel Cupping and Plew-ladding) from the East and North ridings of Yorkshire, also danced on Plough Monday. The dancers often held "flags", used similarly to handkerchiefs in Cotswold and Border dances to emphasise hand movements, or rattling bones, rather than wearing bells but for the same purpose.
 A similar Plough Monday tradition exists in the East Midlands; some of these dances involve swords, usually danced over in a similar manner to baccapipes jigs from Oxfordshire.

Cotswold

Lionel Bacon records Cotswold Morris traditions from these towns and villages:
Abingdon, Adderbury, Ascot-under-Wychwood, Badby, Bampton, Bidford, Bledington, Brackley, Bucknell, Chipping Campden, Ducklington, Eynsham, Headington Quarry, Hinton-in-the-Hedges, Ilmington, Kirtlington, Leafield (Field Town), Longborough, Oddington, Sherbourne, Stanton Harcourt, Upton-upon-Severn and Wheatley.

Bacon also lists the tradition from Lichfield, which is Cotswold-like despite that city's distance from the Cotswold Morris area; the authenticity of this tradition has been questioned. In 2006, a small number of dances from a previously unknown tradition was discovered by Barry Care, MBE, keeper of The Morris Ring Photographic Archive, and a founding member of Moulton Morris Men (Ravensthorpe, Northamptonshire)—two of them danceable.

Other dances listed by Bacon include Border Morris dances from Brimfield, Bromsberrow Heath, Evesham, Leominster, Much Wenlock, Pershore, Upton-upon-Severn, Upton Snodsbury, White Ladies Aston, and miscellaneous non-Cotswold, non-Border dances from Steeple Claydon and Winster. There are a number of traditions which have been collected since the mid-twentieth century, though few have been widely adopted. Examples are Broadwood, Duns Tew, and Ousington-under-Wash in the Cotswold style, and Upper and Lower Penn in the Border style. In fact, for many of the "collected" traditions in Bacon, only sketchy information is available about the way they were danced in the nineteenth century, and they have been reconstructed to a degree that makes them largely twentieth-century inventions as well. Some traditions have been reconstructed in several strikingly disparate ways; an example would be Adderbury, danced very differently by the Adderbury Morris Men and the Adderbury Village Morris.

North West

The North West tradition is named after the North West region of England and has always featured mixed and female sides, at least as far back as the 18th century. There is a picture of Eccles Wakes painted in 1822 that shows both male and female dancers.

Historically, most sides danced in various styles of shoes or boots, although dancing in clogs was also very common. Modern revivalist sides have tended more towards the wearing of clogs. The dances were often associated with rushcarts at the local wakes or holidays, and many teams rehearsed only for these occasions. While some teams continue to rehearse and dance for a single local festival or event (such as the Abram Morris Dancers), the majority of teams now rehearse throughout the year, with the majority of performances occurring in the spring and summer. The dances themselves were often called 'maze' or 'garland dances' as they involved a very intricate set of movements in which the dancers wove in and out of each other. Some dances were performed with a wicker hoop (decorated with garlands of flowers) held above the dancer's head. Some dancers were also associated with a tradition of mumming and hold a pace egging play in their area.

The Britannia Coconut Dancers, named after a mill not far from Bacup, are unique in the tradition, in that they used sawn bobbins to make a noise, and perform to the accompaniment of a brass ensemble. They are one of the few North West Morris groups that still black up their faces. It is said that the dance found its way to the area through Cornishmen who migrated to work in the Rossendale quarries.

Towards the end of the 19th century, the Lancashire tradition was taken up by sides associated with mills and nonconformist chapels, usually composed of young girls. These lasted until the First World War, after which many mutated into "jazz dancers". (A Bolton troupe can be seen in a pre-war documentary by Humphrey Jennings.) The dances have evolved stylistically and the dancers' dress has changed to include pompoms and elements from other groups, such as cheerleaders and Irish dancers. However, they refer to themselves as "Morris dancers", wear bells, and are still mainly based in the Northwest of England. This type of Morris has been around since the 1940s and is also referred to as Carnival or "fluffy Morris" dancing. They take part in many different competitions during the year and end it with a "Championship" where one dance troupe is crowned the champions. This type of Morris is also found in the north of Wales, where there are many different organizations with many different troupes. In 2008 NEMDCO (North of England Morris Dancing Carnival Organization) held a large competition at Blackpool in the Blackpool Tower Ballroom. The winner of this competition was Valencia, a troupe from Liverpool. During the folk revival in the 1960s, many of the old steps to dances such as "Stubbins Lane Garland" were often passed on by old people.

Border

The term "Border Morris" was first used by E. C. Cawte in a 1963 article on the Morris dance traditions of Herefordshire, Shropshire and Worcestershire: counties along the border with Wales. Characteristics of the tradition as practised in the 19th and early 20th centuries include: blackface or coloured facepaint (in some areas), use of either a small strip of bells (in some areas) or no bells at all (in others), costume often consisting of ordinary clothes decorated with ribbons, strips of cloth, or pieces of coloured paper; or sometimes "fancy dress", small numbers of traditional dances in the team repertoire, often only one and rarely more than two, highly variable number of dancers in the set and configurations of the set (some sides had different versions of a dance for different numbers of dancers), and an emphasis on stick dances almost to the exclusion of hankie dances.

Sword dancing
Usually regarded as a type of Morris, although many of the performers themselves consider it as a traditional dance form in its own right, is the sword dance tradition, which includes both rapper sword and longsword traditions. In both styles the "swords" are not actual swords, but implements specifically made for the dance. The dancers are usually linked one to another via the swords, with one end of each held by one dancer and the other end by another. Rapper sides consist of five dancers, who are permanently linked-up during the dance. The rapper sword is a very flexible strip of spring-steel with a wooden handle at each end. The longsword is about 2'6" (0.8 metres) long, with a wooden handle at one end, a blunt tip, and no edge. Sometimes ribbons are threaded through a hole in the tip of the sword, and the dancers grab on to them during the course of the dance. Longsword sides consist usually of five to eight dancers. In both rapper and longsword there is often a supernumerary "character", who dances around, outside, and inside the set.

Mumming
The English mummers play occasionally involves Morris or sword dances either incorporated as part of the play or performed at the same event. Mummers plays are often performed in the streets near Christmas to celebrate the New Year and the coming springtime. In these plays are central themes of death and rebirth.

Other traditions

Other forms include Molly dance from Cambridgeshire. Molly dance, which is associated with Plough Monday, is a parodic form danced in work boots and with at least one Molly man dressed as a woman. The largest Molly Dance event is the Whittlesea Straw Bear Festival, established in 1980, held at Whittlesey in Cambridgeshire in January.

There is also Stave dancing from the south-west and the Abbots Bromley Horn Dance.

Another expression of the Morris tradition is Vessel Cupping. This was practised in the East Riding of Yorkshire until the 1920s. It was a form danced by itinerant ploughboys in sets of three or four, about the time of Candlemas.

Additionally, there is a specifically Welsh version of the art that is distinct from the Borders Morris style. This style is called Nantgarw tradition after a small village in the Taff Valley. One Nantgarw dance, Y Caseg Eira, is derived directly from notes made on traditional Welsh dances from the 1890s. These notes were made by Ceinwen Thomas in the 1950s from the childhood recollections of her mother, Catherine Margretta Thomas. Others are more modern inventions made in the style of older dances. Dances in the Nantgarw style include; Caseg Eira (The Snow Mare), Hela'r Sgwarnog (Hunting The Hare) and Ty Coch Caerdydd (The Red House of Cardiff).

Music

Music was traditionally provided by either a pipe and tabor or a fiddle. These are still used today, but the most common instrument is the melodeon. Accordions and concertinas are also common, and other instruments are sometimes used. Often drums are employed.

Cotswold and sword dancers are most often accompanied by a single player, but Northwest and Border sides often have a band, usually including a drum.

For Cotswold and (to a degree) Border dances, the tunes are traditional and specific: the name of the dance is often actually the name of the tune, and dances of the same name from different traditions will have slightly different tunes. For Northwest and sword dancing there is less often a specific tune for a dance: the players may use several tunes, and will often change tunes during a dance.

For dances which have set tunes, there is often a short song set to the tune. This is sung by the musician(s) or by the whole side as an introduction to the tune before the dance. The songs are usually rural in focus (i.e. related to agricultural practices or village life) and often bawdy or vulgar. Songs for some dances vary from side to side, and some sides omit songs altogether.

Several notable albums have been released, in particular the Morris On series, which consists of Morris On, Son of Morris On, Grandson of Morris On, Great Grandson of Morris On, Morris on the Road, and Mother of all Morris.

Terminology

Like many activities, Morris dancing has a range of words and phrases that it uses in special ways.

Many participants refer to the world of Morris dancing as a whole as "the Morris".

A Morris troupe is usually referred to as a side or a team. The two terms are interchangeable. Despite the terminology, Morris dancing is hardly ever competitive.

A set (which can also be referred to as a side) is a number of dancers in a particular arrangement for a dance. Most Cotswold Morris dances are danced in a rectangular set of six dancers, and most Northwest dances in a rectangular set of eight; but there are many exceptions.

A jig is a dance performed by one (or sometimes two) dancers, rather than by a set. Its music does not usually have the rhythm implied by the word "jig" in other contexts.

The titles of officers vary from side to side, but most sides have at least the following:
 The role of the squire varies. In some sides the squire is the leader, who speaks for the side in public, usually leads or calls the dances, and often decides the programme for a performance. In other sides the squire is more an administrator, with the foreman taking the lead, and the dances called by any experienced dancer.
 The foreman teaches and trains the dancers, and is responsible for the style and standard of the side's dancing. The foreman is often "active" with the "passive" dancers.
 The bagman is traditionally the keeper of the bag—that is to say, the side's funds and equipment. In some sides today, the bagman acts as secretary (particularly bookings secretary) and there is often a separate treasurer.
 On some sides a ragman manages and co-ordinates the team's kit or costume. This may include making bell-pads, ribbon bads, sashes and other accoutrements.

Many sides have one or more fools. A fool is usually extravagantly dressed, and communicates directly with the audience in speech or mime. The fool often dances around and even through a dance without appearing really to be a part of it, but it takes a talented dancer to pull off such fooling while actually adding to and not distracting from the main dance set.

Many sides also have a beast: a dancer in a costume made to look like a real or mythical animal. Beasts mainly interact with the audience, particularly children. In some groups this dancer is called the hobby.

A tradition in Cotswold Morris is a collection of dances that come from a particular area, and have something in common: usually the steps, arm movements, and dance figures. Many newer traditions are invented by revival teams.

Most Cotswold dances alternate common figures (or just figures) with a distinctive figure (or chorus). The common figures are common to all (or some) dances in the tradition; the distinctive figure distinguishes that dance from others in the same tradition. Sometimes (particularly in corner dances) the choruses are not identical, but have their own sequence specific to the tradition. Nevertheless, something about the way the chorus is danced distinguishes that dance from others. Several traditions often have essentially the same dance, where the name, tune, and distinctive figure are the same or similar, but each tradition employs its common figures and style.

In England, an ale is a private party where a number of Morris sides get together and perform dances for their own enjoyment rather than for an audience. Food is usually supplied, and sometimes this is a formal meal known as a feast or ale-feast. Occasionally, an evening ale is combined with a day or weekend of dance, where all the invited sides tour the area and perform in public. In North America the term is widely used to describe a full weekend of dancing involving public performances and sometimes workshops. In the sixteenth to nineteenth centuries, the term "ale" referred to a church- or dale-sponsored event where ale or beer was sold to raise funds. Morris dancers were often employed at such events.

Evolution

Continuance of Morris tradition
The continuance of Morris is as much in the hands of independent groups of enthusiasts as it is in the nationwide groupings such as The Morris Ring or The Morris Federation. So while for some sides there is a feeling that the music and dance recorded in the 19th century should be maintained, there are others who freely reinterpret the music and dance to suit their abilities and including modern influences. In 2008 a front-page article in the Independent Magazine noted the rising influence of neopaganism within the modern Morris tradition. The article featured the views of Neopagan sides Wolf's Head and Vixen Morris and Hunter's Moon Morris and contrasted them with those of the more traditional Long Man Morris Men. The Morris may have become popular in neopaganism thanks to the scholarship of James Frazer, who hypothesized that rural folk traditions were survivals of ancient pagan rituals. Though this view was fiercely criticized even by Frazer's contemporaries, it was fully embraced by Sir Edmund Chambers, one of the first to produce serious writing on English folk plays and dances, and who became a major influence on popular understanding of Morris dancing in the 20th century.

Age and gender issues

In January 2009 The Telegraph published a report predicting the demise of Morris dancing within 20 years, due to the lack of young people willing to take part. This widespread story originated from a senior member of the more traditionally minded Morris Ring, and may only reflect the situation in relation to member groups of that one organisation.

A survey published in December 2020 identified how the profile of morris dancers had evolved since the first survey published in 2014. The number of morris dancers in the UK had increased from 12,800 in 2014 to 13,600 in 2020. The average age of a morris dancer in the UK was 55, up from 52 in 2014. The survey also reported an even balance between male and female performers by 2020.

Use of the Internet
The advent of the Internet in the 1990s has also given Morris sides a new platform upon which to perform. Many Morris sides now have entertaining websites which seek to reflect the public persona of the individual sides as much as record their exploits and list forthcoming performances.

Morris sides have traditionally raised funds by collecting cash from spectators, but in the post-Covid moves to a more cashless society, many sides now use portable card payment terminals.

There are also a multitude of thriving Morris-related blogs and forums, and individual sides are to be found maintaining an interactive presence on major social networking sites. Surveys in 2021 of use of social media services by morris sides found that the Westminster Morris Men YouTube channel had received over 100,00 views and the Shrewsbury Morris's Twitter account had over 100,000 followers.

In popular culture
The success of Terry Pratchett's Discworld novels has seen the entirely invented Dark Morris tradition being brought to life in some form by genuine Morris sides such as the Witchmen Morris and Jack Frost Morris. Dark Morris has been described as having been "evolved from the border revival of the 1970s which was part of a wider neo-traditionalist surge of interest in regional morris styles".

Kit and clothing

There is great variety shown in how Morris sides dress, from the predominantly white clothing of Cotswold sides to the tattered jackets worn by Border teams. Some common items of clothing are:
bellpads; baldrics; braces; rosettes; sashes; waistcoats; tatter-coats; knee-length breeches; wooden clogs; straw hats, top hats, or bowlers; neckerchiefs; armbands.

Namesakes
 The dance may have given name to the board games three men's morris, six men's morris and nine men's morris.
 Erasmus Grasser, a German sculptor, created 16 realistic animated wooden figures in the late 15th century called the Morris dancers.
 Two ships named Morris Dance served in the Royal Navy in the 20th century.

See also

 
 
 
 
 
 
 
 
 
 
 
 , a 2011 documentary film by Tim Plester and Rob Curry

References

Citations

General references 
 Forrest, John (1999). The History of Morris Dancing, 1458–1750. Cambridge: James Clarke & Co.

External links

 The English Folk Dance and Song Society at Cecil Sharp House, London
 The Morris & Sword: Dances of England

 
Articles containing video clips